INS Shardul is the lead ship of the  amphibious warfare vessels of the Indian Navy. On 3 October 2008, Shardul was affiliated to the 5 Armoured Regiment of the Indian Army in an on-board ceremony, at the Mumbai Naval Base.

History
Shardul started sea trials on 3 November 2006 and was commissioned into the Indian Navy, on 4 January 2007 by the defence minister A.K Antony at the naval base  in Karwar. In March 2017 the ship was deployed on a two-month-long deployment in the south Indian Ocean to provide surveillance support in the region. On March 10, 2020, INS Shardul arrived at Port Antsiranana with relief material for Madagascar, after Cyclone Diane and floods earlier in the year. 600 tonnes of rice were handed over. This is the biggest relief load ever carried by any Indian warship.

References

External links
Shardul class @ Bharat-rakshak.com
LST(L) Shardul @ Global security.com
 

Shardul-class tank landing ships
Amphibious warfare vessels of the Indian Navy
2004 ships